Sean Thompson (born 5 September 1972) is a Guyanese cricketer. He played in one first-class match for Guyana in 1999/00.

See also
 List of Guyanese representative cricketers

References

External links
 

1972 births
Living people
Guyanese cricketers
Guyana cricketers